The Sankan Biriwa (Tingi Hills) No or Non - Hunting Forest Reserve is found in Sierra Leone. It was established in 1947. This site is 118 km2.

General Information
The reserve is located on the easternmost of the mountain ranges in Sierra Leone, close to the eastern border with the Republic of Guinea. The highest point is the Sankan Biriwa massif, on which there are two peaks separated by a narrow gorge. Both peaks rise above 1,800 m, with the northernmost, at 1,850 m, being the second-highest peak in the country. This massif is the source of tributaries of two major rivers, the Sewa and the Mano. The vegetation consists of forest-savanna mosaic from 305 m to 915 m elevation, shrub-savanna on the plateau at 915–1,650 m, and montane grassland above 1,680 m. Gallery forest occurs along the river tributaries at 450–915 m and, in places, up to 1,375 m.

References

Protected areas of Sierra Leone
Forest reserves of Sierra Leone